Bojan Tadić (Serbian Cyrillic: Бојан Taдић, born March 2, 1981) is a Bosnian retired footballer who last played for Sloboda Novi Grad

Club career
Born in Banja Luka, SR Bosnia and Herzegovina to a Serb father and a Croat mother, he previously played for FK BSK Banja Luka, OFK Beograd in the First League of FR Yugoslavia, then with NK Zagreb in the Prva HNL, Herfølge Boldklub in the Danish Superliga, FK Borac Banja Luka in the Premier League of Bosnia and Herzegovina, FK Kozara Gradiška in the First League of the Republika Srpska and Petrochimi Tabriz F.C. in Iran.

Honours
NK Zagreb
Prva HNL: 2001-02

References

External links
 Profile at FK Kozara Website
 Interview and career story at Borac B.Luka website 

1981 births
Living people
Sportspeople from Banja Luka
Bosnia and Herzegovina people of Serbian descent
Bosnia and Herzegovina people of Croatian descent
Association football midfielders
Bosnia and Herzegovina footballers
FK BSK Banja Luka players
OFK Beograd players
NK Zagreb players
FK Borac Banja Luka players
Herfølge Boldklub players
FK Kozara Gradiška players
Petrochimi Tabriz F.C. players
FK Sloboda Mrkonjić Grad players
FK Sutjeska Foča players
FK Sloboda Novi Grad players
First League of Serbia and Montenegro players
Croatian Football League players
Danish Superliga players
Premier League of Bosnia and Herzegovina players
First League of the Republika Srpska players
Azadegan League players
Bosnia and Herzegovina expatriate footballers
Expatriate footballers in Serbia and Montenegro
Bosnia and Herzegovina expatriate sportspeople in Serbia and Montenegro
Expatriate footballers in Croatia
Bosnia and Herzegovina expatriate sportspeople in Croatia
Expatriate men's footballers in Denmark
Bosnia and Herzegovina expatriate sportspeople in Denmark
Expatriate footballers in Iran
Bosnia and Herzegovina expatriate sportspeople in Iran